Cyperus cyperoides is a species of sedge that is native to parts of Africa, Asia, Australia and Oceania.

See also 
 List of Cyperus species

References 

cyperoides
Plants described in 1898
Taxa named by Otto Kuntze
Flora of Queensland
Flora of New South Wales
Flora of China
Flora of India
Flora of Angola
Flora of Bangladesh
Flora of Benin
Flora of Burkina Faso
Flora of Burundi
Flora of Cambodia
Flora of Cameroon
Flora of the Central African Republic
Flora of Chad
Flora of the Republic of the Congo
Flora of Easter Island
Flora of Equatorial Guinea
Flora of Eritrea
Flora of Ethiopia
Flora of the Democratic Republic of the Congo
Flora of Gabon
Flora of the Gambia
Flora of Guinea
Flora of Guinea-Bissau
Flora of Japan
Flora of Java
Flora of Kenya
Flora of Korea
Flora of South Africa
Flora of Laos
Flora of Liberia
Flora of Madagascar
Flora of Malawi
Flora of Malaysia
Flora of Mali
Flora of Mauritius
Flora of Myanmar
Flora of Namibia
Flora of Nepal
Flora of New Guinea
Flora of Nigeria
Flora of Pakistan
Flora of the Philippines
Flora of Rwanda